The 2004 Cologne Centurions season was the inaugural season for the franchise in the NFL Europe League (NFLEL). The team was led by head coach Peter Vaas and played its home games at RheinEnergieStadion in Cologne, Germany. They finished the regular season in fourth place with a record of four wins and six losses.

The Centurions replaced the Barcelona Dragons for this season, keeping only two members from Barcelona's 2003 roster: linebacker Cedric Cotar and receiver Marco Martos.

Offseason

Free agent draft

Personnel

Staff

Roster

Schedule

Standings

Game summaries

Week 1: at Rhein Fire

Week 2: vs Frankfurt Galaxy

Week 3: at Berlin Thunder

Week 4: vs Scottish Claymores

Week 5: at Frankfurt Galaxy

Week 6: vs Berlin Thunder

Week 7: at Amsterdam Admirals

Week 8: vs Rhein Fire

Week 9: vs Amsterdam Admirals

Week 10: at Scottish Claymores

Notes

References

Cologne
Cologne Centurions (NFL Europe) seasons